Reginald Bernard "Reggie" Rembert (born December 25, 1966) is a retired American football wide receiver in the National Football League. He was drafted in the second round (28th overall) of the 1990 NFL Draft by the New York Jets. He played college football at West Virginia.

Rembert played only three of four seasons in the NFL. He did not play as a rookie, as he never signed with the Jets and was traded to the Cincinnati Bengals.

Early life
Rembert began his football career at the age of seven, when he joined a Pee Wee league. He became the Most Valuable Player, but was cut from his seventh-grade team.

To begin his high school career, Rembert played tailback. However, in his senior year, he was moved to receiver. Then at 6'4" and 160-pounds, he recorded 15 touchdown receptions and All-State honors, but could not qualify for a scholarship.

College career

Start at West Virginia
After being named an All-American at the Independence Community College junior college, Rembert was picked up in the summer of 1987 by the Mountaineers and enrolled at West Virginia for the 1988 season. He was coached by receivers coach Doc Holliday, and was reported by Holliday to have run a 4.3 40-yard dash.

Junior (Juco. transfer 1988)
As a junior, Rembert was All-American quarterback Major Harris' favorite target for the Fiesta Bowl-bound Mountaineers. He reeled in 23 passes for 516 yards and seven touchdowns as a major deep threat, averaging 22.7 yards per catch. He also ran the end-around nine times for 144 yards and two touchdowns. After the season, he made the Associated Press All-East Team.
at independence community college.

Senior (1989)
As a senior in 1989, Rembert increased his numbers to 47 catches for 850 yards and 11 touchdowns. His best game was against Pitt in the Backyard Brawl, when he caught a career-high 145 yards on five receptions.

Rembert is often considered one of the greatest Mountaineer receivers in the university's football history, along with other greats such as Jerry Porter and Chris Henry. Rembert ended his career close to many West Virginia football records, and is ranked high on many of the career receiving statistic lists.

Career statistics
Rembert ranks 16th on WVU's all-time leading receivers.

Professional career

New York Jets
Rembert was drafted by the New York Jets in the second round, 28th overall in the 1990 NFL Draft. Rembert never played during the 1990 season for the Jets as they were unable to come to an agreement on a contract, and eventually his rights were traded to the Cincinnati Bengals before the 1991 NFL season.

Cincinnati Bengals
Rembert was signed by the Cincinnati Bengals for the 1991 season. Although he played in all 16 games, Rembert only recorded nine receptions for 117 yards and a touchdown. The following season, 1992, Rembert only played in nine games, but had his best statistical season of his career. He caught 19 passes for 219 yards on the season from quarterback Boomer Esiason, who was playing his final season in Cincinnati.

In Rembert's final season, 1993, he played in just three games. He recorded eight receptions for 101 yards to end his career.

Career statistics

Personal
Rembert is considered one of the all-time "Impact Recruits" for WVU, ranking in at #7.

He has five children, one of whom, Reggie, was a walk-on at West Virginia and played wide receiver.

References

External links
 West Virginia Mountaineers stats at WVUstats.com

1966 births
Living people
People from Okeechobee, Florida
American football wide receivers
West Virginia Mountaineers football players
New York Jets players
Cincinnati Bengals players
Independence Pirates football players
Okeechobee High School alumni